Cosmopterix setariella is a moth of the family Cosmopterigidae. It is known from Russia, China (Jiangxi) and Japan.

The length of the forewings is about 4.5 mm.

The larvae feed on Setaria viridis. They probably mine the leaves of their host plant.

References

setariella
Moths of Japan